The Heinrich Giese House is a historic house in Grand Island, Nebraska. It was built in 1863 as a log cabin by Heinrich Giese, an immigrant from Holstein, Germany. Giese lived here with his wife, née Mary Obermiller, and their seven children. The house has been listed on the National Register of Historic Places since July 26, 2006.

References

		
National Register of Historic Places in Hall County, Nebraska
Houses completed in 1863
1863 establishments in Nebraska Territory